Washington Jay Mccormick, Jr. (January 4, 1884 – March 7, 1949) was a U.S. Representative from Montana.

Born in Missoula, Montana, Mccormick attended the University of Montana and the University of Notre Dame in Indiana. He is named after his father, Washington J. McCormick, a prominent Missoula citizen. He graduated from Harvard University in 1906 and from the law department of Columbia University, New York City, in 1910. He was admitted to the New York bar the same year. He returned to Missoula, Montana and admitted to the Montana bar in 1911, engaging in the practice of law. He served as member of the Montana House of Representatives from 1918 to 1920.

Mccormick was elected as a Republican to the Sixty-seventh Congress (March 4, 1921 - March 3, 1923), but was unsuccessful in his reelection bid in 1922 to the Sixty-eighth Congress. He continued the practice of law until his retirement, when he devoted his time to writing.

In 1923, a bill drafted by McCormick became the first proposed legislation regarding the United States' national language that would have made "American" the national language in order to differentiate the United States's language from that of England. This bill did not pass in Congress despite significant support—especially from Irish immigrants who were resentful of British influence.

McCormick allowed his family ranch at Fort Owen to become a state park. He resided in the Bitter Root Valley, near Stevensville, Montana, until his death in Missoula, Montana, March 7, 1949.

He was interred in Missoula Cemetery.

References 

1884 births
1949 deaths
Republican Party members of the Montana House of Representatives
Politicians from Missoula, Montana
Montana State University alumni
Harvard University alumni
Columbia Law School alumni
University of Notre Dame alumni
Republican Party members of the United States House of Representatives from Montana
20th-century American politicians
People from Stevensville, Montana